Since the foundation of the International League (IL) in 1912, its pitchers have thrown 165 no-hitters, which include 17 perfect games. Of these no-hitters, 81 were pitched in games that lasted at least the full 9 innings, while 84 were pitched in games shortened due to weather or that were played in doubleheaders, which are typically 7 innings. Only 4 of the league's 17 perfect games were tossed in full 9-inning games. Twenty-three no-hitters were combined—thrown by two or more pitchers on the same team.

A no-hit game occurs when a pitcher (or pitchers) allows no hits during the entire course of a game. A batter may still reach base via a walk, an error, a fielder's choice, a hit by pitch, a passed ball or wild pitch on strike three, or catcher's interference. Due to these methods of reaching base, it is possible for a team to score runs without getting any hits. While the vast majority of no-hitters are shutouts, teams which went hitless have managed to score runs in their respective games 16 times in IL games, some in extra innings.

The first International League no-hitter was thrown on July 6, 1912, by John Frill of the Jersey City Skeeters against the Providence Grays at West Side Park in Jersey City, New Jersey. Played as the second game of a doubleheader, Frill allowed no baserunners over the course of the seven-inning game, making it also the first perfect game in the league's history. The first nine-inning no-hit game occurred on July 14, 1915, when Providence's Joe Oeschger accomplished the feat against the Toronto Maple Leafs at Kinsley Park in Providence, Rhode Island. The first nine-inning perfect game was thrown on August 15, 1952, by Dick Marlowe of the Buffalo Bisons against the Baltimore Orioles at Memorial Stadium in Baltimore, Maryland.

Nine league pitchers have thrown multiple no-hitters. The pitcher who holds the record for the shortest time between no-hit games is Rip Jordan, who pitched two for the Buffalo Bisons 45 days apart in 1919. In addition to Jordan, Augie Prudhomme (1927 and 1928), Bill Harris (1936 and 1937), Lou Polli (1937 and 1945), Earl Harrist (both in 1946), Duke Markell (1953 and 1955), Stan Bahnsen (1966 and 1967), Dave Vineyard (1966 and 1967), and Justin Wilson (both in 2012) have each thrown two no-hitters.

The team with the most no-hitters is the Rochester Red Wings (previously known as the Hustlers and Tribe), with 20, two of which were perfect games. They are followed by the original Buffalo Bisons (17 no-hitters, 2 of them perfect games) and the Toronto Maple Leafs (17 no-hitters). The team with the most perfect games is the Syracuse Mets (previously known as the Chiefs and SkyChiefs), with three. Of the four nine-inning perfect games in the league's history, two were thrown by members of the Pawtucket Red Sox, both having occurred at McCoy Stadium.

No-hitters

No-hitters by team

Active International League teams appear in bold.

See also
List of American Association no-hitters
List of Pacific Coast League no-hitters

Notes

References
Specific

General

No-hitters
International League no-hitters